Culter oxycephaloides is a species of ray-finned fish in the genus Culter.

Footnotes 

Culter (fish)
Fish described in 1908